Lito Carruthers was a British film editor.

Selected filmography
 Madonna of the Seven Moons (1945)
 Latin Quarter (1945)
 The Echo Murders (1945)
 Temptation Harbour (1947)
 Daughter of Darkness (1948)
 Obsession (1949)
 Valley of Eagles (1951)
 My Wife's Lodger (1952)
 My Death Is a Mockery (1952)
 Is Your Honeymoon Really Necessary? (1953)
 Conflict of Wings (1954)
 A Yank in Ermine (1955)
 Fire Maidens from Outer Space (1956)
 Battle of the V-1 (1958)
 Life in Emergency Ward 10 (1959)
 And the Same to You (1960)
 Too Hot to Handle (1960)

References

External links
 

Date of birth unknown
Date of death unknown
British film editors